Isuikwuato is a local government area in Abia State in southeastern Nigeria. The name Isu-Ikwu-Ato translates from Igbo as 'three Isu families or lineage' and refers to the three lineages descended from the Isu people, in what is now a local government area. The three brothers are Imenyi who is the eldest, Oguduasaa, his younger brother from the same mother and Isuamawo the second oldest and first from the second wife. These three major clans which also harbour various communities in each of them make up the present day Isuikwuato. It has an estimated population of over 50,000 people. Isuikwuato has natural resources such as iron ore and kaolin. Oil lines flow through Isuikwuato and there have been cases of burst pipe which have had severe effects on the local economy and environment. The major cash crops are palm oil and cassava. The soil at Isuikwuato is loose and suffers from Erosion and this left some dangerous erosion sites in the area. They lack the needed government backing to build drainages around the area to guide the flow of water without further harming the already crying soil. Blessed with hills and highlands, the town will appreciate water infrastructures because water is an important but hard resource to get in Isuikwuato. Isuikwuato is also home to Abia State University Uturu.

Isuikwuato people are predominantly Christians. Catholic, Anglicans, Presbyterians and Methodists dominate other denominations, but denominations such as Assemblies of God have increased in number.

Localities 
 Amaba
 Eluoma: Umuebere Nkuma (Obu-Na-Ebere Nkuma), Umuebere Aja, Umuama, Ekebe, Obodo, Umusoo, Umuokogbuo, Umuerem, Ndi Ogu, Umuezeoka, Umuihe (formerly, Umu Ohu) and Igidi-Inyim
 Umuasua
 Ozara
 Otampa
Acha: Agbama, Umuokombo, Etiti-Orji, Amangwu, Amachara, Ama-Ahia, Amaisisi.

Notable people
 Uche Ogah, Former Minister for Mines and Steel Development 
 Ndubuisi Ekekwe, American Professor of Robotics
 Rear Admiral Ndubuisi Kanu, former military governor of Imo State and Lagos State
 Major General Ike Nwachukwu, former military governor of Imo State, Former Senator of Abia State, Former Nigerian Minister for foreign Affairs
Azubuike Ihejirika, Commander of the Federal Republic, CFR (Born 13 February 1956) from Eluobai Ovim was a Nigerian Soldier and former Nigerian Army Chief of Army Staff, COAS
 Navy Captain Christopher Osondu, former appointed military administrator of Cross River State
 Professor Ernest Ojukwu SAN, Nigerian Lawyer 
 Kelechi Emeteole, aka Caterpillar, Nigerian Footballer and coach.  Former player and captain of Spartans which later became Iwuanyanwu Nationale then Heartland FC. As a player he had spells with the Nigerian National team. His coaching career included spells with Rangers, Heartland FC and El Kanemi. He died in June 2017 from complications of throat cancer  
 Sunday Mba, Nigerian professional footballer. 
 Basketmouth, entertainer and stand up comedian.
 Oluchi Onweagba, international model and first winner of M-Net Face of Africa.
 Linda Ejiofor, renowned Nollywood actress
 Raymond Nkemdirim, Security Expert/Former Director of Operations, DSS

See also 
 List of villages in Abia State

References

Populated places in Abia State
Local Government Areas in Igboland
Local Government Areas in Abia State